The South American professional club basketball system or South American professional club basketball pyramid is a series of interconnected competitions for professional basketball clubs in South America. The system has a hierarchical format with a promotion and relegation system between competitions at different levels. There are currently two different competitions on the pyramid – the 1st tier Basketball Champions League Americas, and the 2nd tier FIBA South American League. The 1st-tier level Basketball Champions League Americas is organized by FIBA Americas, and the 2nd-tier level FIBA South American League is organized by the South American Basketball Association (ABASU), which operates as a regional sub-zone of FIBA Americas.

The tier pyramid

Current South American basketball competitions

Evolution of the South American basketball competitions
The table below shows the tier structure of the pyramid for both the former eras and the current era. Current tier competitions are indicated in bold.

History 
The evolution of the top-tier international South American inter–continental and South American inter–regional professional club basketball competitions (1946—present):

 CONSUBASQUET era: (1946–2007)
 Campeonato Sudamericano de Clubes Campeones de Básquetbol (English: South American Basketball Championship of Champions Clubs): (1946–1993)
 Campeonato Panamericano de Clubes de Básquetbol (English: Pan American Basketball Club Championship): (1993–2000)
 Liga Sudamericana de Básquetbol (LSB) (English: South American Basketball League): (2000–2007)
FIBA Americas era: (2007–present)
 FIBA Americas League: (2007 – 2019)
 Basketball Champions League Americas: (2019 – present)

See also 
 League system
 European professional club basketball system
 Spanish basketball league system
 Greek basketball league system
 Italian basketball league system
 French basketball league system
 Russian basketball league system
 Turkish basketball league system
 German basketball league system
 Serbian basketball league system
 Polish basketball league system
 Hungarian basketball league system

References

External links 
 FIBA Americas League official website
 FIBA South American League official website

Basketball league systems
FIBA Americas League
Liga Sudamericana de Básquetbol